Joseph Ignatius Mulligan (July 31, 1913 – June 5, 1986), nicknamed "Big Joe", was a pitcher in Major League Baseball who played briefly for the Boston Red Sox during the  season.

A native of Weymouth, Massachusetts, Mulligan attended the College of the Holy Cross. In his lone major league season, he posted a 1–0 record with 13 strikeouts and a 3.63 ERA in 14 appearances, including two starts, one complete game and 44⅔ innings of work for Boston. In 1936, Mulligan pitched for Falmouth in the Cape Cod Baseball League. He died in 1986 in West Roxbury, Massachusetts at age 72.

See also
1934 Boston Red Sox season
Boston Red Sox all-time roster

External links

Retrosheet
Joe Mulligan biography from Society for American Baseball Research (SABR)

References

Boston Red Sox players
Major League Baseball pitchers
Holy Cross Crusaders baseball players
Falmouth Commodores players
Cape Cod Baseball League players (pre-modern era)
Baseball players from Massachusetts
1913 births
1986 deaths
People from Roxbury, Boston